The Boucheuse is a river in south-western France. It is a right tributary of the river Auvézère.

The river begins in the commune of Magnac-Bourg in Haute-Vienne. It traverses the Corrèze department. It flows into the Auvézère near Payzac, in the Dordogne department. The main tributary is the Valentine at its right bank.

References

Rivers of France
Rivers of Dordogne
Rivers of Haute-Vienne
Rivers of Corrèze
Rivers of Nouvelle-Aquitaine